Abraham Aakre (11 October 1874 – 6 October 1948) was a Norwegian teacher and politician.

He was born in Drangedal to farmers Gunder Gundersen Aakre and Karen Jensine Aakre. He was elected representative to the Storting for the period 1934–1936, for the Labour Party. He served as mayor of Halden from 1919 to 1920 and from 1925 to 1931.

References

1874 births
1948 deaths
People from Drangedal
People from Halden
Norwegian schoolteachers
Mayors of places in Østfold
Labour Party (Norway) politicians
Members of the Storting